Free Homeland Party may refer to:

 Partido Patria Libre, a political party in Paraguay
 Partido Pátria Livre, a political party in Brazil